Turbo squamiger is a species of sea snail, marine gastropod mollusk in the family Turbinidae.

 Taxonomic status: Some authors place the name in the subgenus Turbo (Marmarostoma)

Description
The length of the shell varies between 20 mm and 45 mm. The imperforate shell is globosely ovate, with the suture excavated. The 5–6 whorls are convex and carinate. The body whorl is ventricose, with erect tubercles at the suture. They are spirally armed throughout with scales, the upper and lower scales much larger. Its color pattern is pale green, dotted and variegated with reddish brown. The interior is silvery.

Distribution
This species occurs in the Pacific Ocean from the Gulf of California, Western Mexico to Peru; and off Galapagos Islands.

References

 Alf A. & Kreipl K. (2003). A Conchological Iconography: The Family Turbinidae, Subfamily Turbininae, Genus Turbo. Conchbooks, Hackenheim Germany.
 Williams, S.T. (2007). Origins and diversification of Indo-West Pacific marine fauna: evolutionary history and biogeography of turban shells (Gastropoda, Turbinidae). Biological Journal of the Linnean Society, 2007, 92, 573–592.

External links
 

squamiger
Gastropods described in 1843